Ilgar Yasharovich Mammadov (also spelled Mamedov, ; born 15 November 1965 in Baku, Azerbaijan SSR) is  a Soviet and Russian fencer of Azerbaijani origin. President of the Russian Fencing Federation.

Career 
Mammadov won two Olympic gold medals in the team foil competition, at the 1988 Summer Olympics in Seoul and at the 1996 Summer Olympics in Atlanta.

After retiring from competition Mammadov became a fencing master and referee. In 2008 he became the Russian representative to the Refereeing Commission of the International Fencing Federation (FIE). He was appointed director of fencing for the Russian Fencing Federation after Vladislav Pavlovich's resignation following disappointing results at the 2012 Summer Olympics. In 2013 he was inducted into the FIE's Hall of Fame.

Mammadov graduated from the Baku State University. He married World and European champion fencer Yelena Jemayeva. They live in Moscow and have two daughters: Milena and Ayla.

References

External links 
 
 
 

1965 births
Living people
Sportspeople from Baku
Soviet male fencers
Russian male fencers
Azerbaijani emigrants to Russia
Russian sportspeople of Azerbaijani descent
Fencers at the 1988 Summer Olympics
Fencers at the 1992 Summer Olympics
Fencers at the 1996 Summer Olympics
Fencers at the 2000 Summer Olympics
Olympic fencers of the Soviet Union
Olympic fencers of the Unified Team
Olympic fencers of Russia
Olympic gold medalists for the Soviet Union
Olympic gold medalists for Russia
Olympic medalists in fencing
Medalists at the 1988 Summer Olympics
Medalists at the 1996 Summer Olympics